The 1999 Indian general election was held to elect 20 members to the thirteenth Lok Sabha from Kerala. Indian National Congress-led United Democratic Front (UDF) won 11 seats, while the Left Democratic Front (LDF), led by Communist Party of India (Marxist) (CPI(M)) won the remaining 9 seats. Both coalitions managed to win the same number of seats as in the previous election, held in the previous year. Turnout for the election was measured at 70.19% of the eligible population.

Alliances and parties 

UDF is a Kerala legislative alliance formed by INC veteran K. Karunakaran. LDF comprises primarily of CPI(M) and the CPI, forming the Left Front in the national level. National Democratic Alliance (NDA), led by Bharatiya Janata Party (BJP) contested in 19 seats.

United Democratic Front

Left Democratic Front

National Democratic Alliance

List of elected MPs

Results

Performance of political parties

By constituency

See also 

 Elections in Kerala
 Politics of Kerala

References

Indian general elections in Kerala
1990s in Kerala
1999 Indian general election